The PBR Global Cup is a bull riding team competition that was developed in 2017 by the Professional Bull Riders (PBR) organization, which intends to give the winning country the ability to say they have the best bull riders. Previously, there was a similar team event called the PBR World Cup that the PBR ran from 2007 to 2010, but this new event is not a continuation of the previous one. The PBR Global Cup consists of teams from five countries including Australia, Brazil, Canada, Mexico, and the United States.

A different country holds the team event each year as this is an annual event. The host country does retain a competitive advantage. The best riders in each team are matched against the best riders from other teams. The contest is a series that continues until one country holds all five pieces of the Global Cup, which includes the horn and the native soil of each nation. Only one country will claim the "Toughest Nation on Dirt."

Competition

Competition description

The PBR Global Cup is an annual event. Each team rides with a uniform that represents their respective country. The hosting country each year is granted an advantage. For the events in Edmonton and Sydney, that advantage was twice the number of competitors as the visiting teams. When the date for the first-ever edition of the event in the U.S. was announced PBR debuted a new format. In place of an increased roster, Team USA would field two teams, Eagles and Wolves. Making modern sports history, the Wolves team was announced to be composed exclusively of Native American bull riders.

At stake for the home team is their piece of the five-part Global Cup trophy which is a horn and their national soil. The home team must win the event to successfully keep their trophy piece and native soil. Otherwise, the visiting team who wins the event is awarded these items. The competition continues until one nation captures all five horns for the trophy−including the native soil−of each country. That country lays claim to the title, "The Toughest Nation on Dirt."

Trophy and native soil

The trophy is composed of five individual bull horns that represent each country. Taken as a whole, the trophy represents the collective spirit of this worldwide competition. Each country's bull horn piece of the trophy also includes a vessel that holds its native soil. At each event's opening ceremonies, is a presentation where all share in viewing the host's riders depositing their dirt into their trophy piece. Following the presentation, the battle for the horn piece commences. Each team protects their native soil as a matter of pride and honor for their country.

Competition format

The event is a two-day international competition which features 14 riders from the host country against 7 riders from each of the visiting countries. The home country is intentionally given a home town advantage with twice as many bull riders. Each team also has head coaches and assistant coaches.

Competitors earn money based on their team's performance. First place splits $400,000 among themselves while the last place team earns $42,000. The individual rider who scores the most points combining his multiple rides gets a bonus, while the rider with the highest-scored individual ride also gets a bonus.

Annual events

2017 inaugural event

The competition format for the inaugural event was very different from a traditional bull riding event. There were two days of competition. Each team attempted to score up to 14 qualified rides. The winning team was decided by the highest combined score. Coaches made all the riding decisions. The winning team was determined by points. Each qualified ride was judged up to 100 points. The total of all qualified ride points was combined for the total points earned. The team with the highest number of points became the winner, in this case, Team USA had the most points with 1,026.75 points. Team USA's riders rode 12 bulls out of 18 total outs (trips out of the bucking chute) and had one disqualification for a bulls ridden ratio of 12-18-1 (qualified rides-outs-disqualified). For first place they earned the top prize money of $400,000 and, of course, the Canadian horn piece of the Global Cup Trophy.

In 2017, the inaugural event was hosted from November 9 through 11 at Rogers Place in Edmonton, Alberta, Canada. The event paid out the second largest prize amount in North America, with only the PBR World Finals paying out more. By the end of the event, Team USA had become the winner. Team USA consisted of 2016 PBR World Champion Cooper Davis, Derek Kolbaba, Brennon Eldred, Cole Melancon, Stormy Wing, 2009 PBR Rookie of the Year Cody Nance, 2012 PRCA Champion Bull Rider Cody Teel and was coached by two-time PBR World Champion Justin McBride.

Winning statistics 

Source:

2018 event
In 2018, the next event was hosted in the Qudos Bank Arena in Sydney, New South Wales, Australia, from June 9 though 10. Fourteen of Australia's top cowboys will compete to win the event on their home turf.

The prizes that the PBR paid out in Australian are a record $750,000 for that country. Qudos Bank Arena is first-rate facility is situated in Sydney Olympic Park, and is formerly known as the Sydney Super Dome, which completed construction in 1999. It formerly hosted the PBR Australia Finals since 2010. The general manager of PBR Australia said that this venue has also hosted the Olympic Games, and that it is very fitting to host this event in the largest city in Australia.

For Australia, they chose their competition format, and they announced it in February 2018. Each team featured three competitors. Those competitors were based on the final 2017 world standings for the series that started in Canada the previous November.

 Australia: Lachlan Richardson, Aaron Kleier, and Troy Wilkinson
 Brazil: Eduardo Aparecido, Kaique Pacheco, and Jose Vitor Leme
 Canada: Dakota Buttar, Jordan Hansen, and Brock Radford.
 Mexico: Edgar Durazo, Francisco Morales, and Juan Carlos Contreras
 United States: 2017 PBR World Champion  Jess Lockwood, Derek Kolbaba, and Cooper Davis
Source: 

Each visiting team was composed of 7 bull riders in Sydney. Coaches chose the riders. Team Australia, same as the home team inaugural event, benefited from the host team advantage, and had 14 bull riders. Australia's additional 11 bull riders were chosen by 1998 PBR World Champion Troy Dunn, their coach. The PBR chose the coaches for this event and they were as follows:

 Australia: Troy Dunn
 Brazil: Renato Nunes
 Canada: Aaron Roy
 Mexico: Gerardo Venegas
 United States: Justin McBride

McBride defended his team's possession of the Canadian horn and native soil they won in the Canadian event in 2017. Roy was returned to helm the Canadian team again. Dunn, Nunes, and Venegas were new to coaching their teams in their respective countries. All three bull riders have exceptionally notable backgrounds that qualified them for this position.

Lastly, the competition was based on the best 12 qualified rides. The team with the highest aggregate score when the event concluded won the trophy with the Canadian horn and also received the Australian horn. In this event, the Brazil team won the trophy.

Winning statistics 

Source:

2019 event

The third leg of the PBR Global Cup took place on February 9 and 10, 2019 at AT&T Stadium in Arlington, Texas, United States. For this event, the United States was split into two teams: the Eagles and the Wolves (an all-Native American squad). Team Brazil won their second straight Global Cup at the Arlington stop.

2020 event

On February 15 and 16, 2020, the PBR Global Cup again visited AT&T Stadium in Arlington, Texas, marking the first time a global PBR competition had visited the same venue in consecutive years. The United States was again split into two teams, the Eagles and the Wolves. The competition was won by the USA Eagles.

2022 event

There was no PBR Global Cup event in 2021 due to each of the PBR countries having inconsistent COVID-19 protocols, but the event returned to AT&T Stadium in Arlington, Texas for a third, non-consecutive year. Unlike previous Global Cups where the event spanned two days, the 2022 edition of the Global Cup was a one-day event and instead of 7 riders for each visiting country and 14 for the home country, the number of riders was shortened to 5 for each visiting country and 10 for the home country (5 riders each for USA Eagles and USA Wolves). It was once again won by Team USA Eagles.

Tracking

Annual placements 

Source:

Medal table

Source:

References

External links
 Official sites of Professional Bull Riders, Inc.:
 OfficialSite
 Canada
 Australia
 Mexico 
 Brazil 
 Edmonton Global Cup Results

Rodeo competition series
Organizations based in Colorado
Sports in Colorado
World cups
Professional Bull Riders
Recurring sporting events established in 2017